Walter Carlyle (23 May 1938, in Grangemouth – 2007) was a Scottish footballer who played as a right winger. Carlyle began his career in the late 1950s with Rangers but left without playing a first team match and moved to Junior side Shettleston. In 1960, Carlyle moved back to the senior game's top level with newly promoted Dundee United, netting 39 goals in 78 league appearances during his time at Tannadice. In 1964, Carlyle moved to Motherwell, where he stayed for around a year, before playing for St Johnstone and then the Queen of the South side of Allan Ball, Iain McChesney and Billy Collings. Carlyle ended his playing career with spells at East Stirlingshire and Alloa Athletic. He retired at the end of the 1960s.

Carlyle died in 2007.

External links
 

1938 births
People from Grangemouth
2007 deaths
Scottish footballers
Scottish Football League players
Rangers F.C. players
Dundee United F.C. players
Motherwell F.C. players
St Johnstone F.C. players
Queen of the South F.C. players
East Stirlingshire F.C. players
Alloa Athletic F.C. players
Glasgow United F.C. players
Footballers from Falkirk (council area)
Association football wingers